Bangladesh Youth Leadership Center (BYLC) is the first leadership institution in Bangladesh. Originally developed at Harvard Kennedy School's Center for Public Leadership in 2008, Bangladesh Youth Leadership Center was established in Bangladesh in 2009. The signature component of BYLC is the four-month-long youth leadership program, Building Bridges through Leadership Training (BBLT). Besides the BBLT program, BYLC also conducts programs and workshops for university students.

About

Formation 
The concept of a youth leadership center was originally developed at Harvard University's Kennedy School of Government in January 2008. The proposal for a month-long leadership program, Building Bridges Through Leadership Training (BBLT), was jointly developed by Ejaj Ahmad, then a graduate student at Harvard University, and Shammi S. Quddus, then an undergraduate student at Massachusetts Institute of Technology (MIT). The proposal was one of a hundred college projects awarded a grant by Projects for Peace in 2008.

Ahmad and Quddus ran the pilot phase of BBLT in Chittagong in the summer of 2008, with technical and financial support from Massachusetts Institute of Technology (MIT) Public Service Center. Building on the success and lessons learned from the pilot, the BBLT program was encapsulated within the framework of a non-profit organization, the Bangladesh Youth Leadership Center (BYLC).

In early 2009, BYLC was registered with the Registrar of Joint Stock Companies and Firms in Bangladesh as a non-partisan social venture.

The signature program of BYLC, BBLT, expanded into a four-month program for BBLT 4 in July 2010. The first month consists of intensive classroom training in leadership skills after school. In the next three months, students work in teams to implement their leadership training by designing and conducting community projects in local slums.

Activities

Art and Practice of Leadership 
The Art and Practice of Leadership (APL) is a three-day national workshop for third and fourth year university students. This workshop provides participants with an exceptional opportunity to learn about leadership, communication, and career development. The participants embark on a stimulating personal journey that develops their leadership potential and helps them gain new competencies to better compete in the job market. Employers today look for more than just a degree. They look for individuals who will not only excel in their professional capacity, but will also lead, inspire, and mobilize people around them. Participants are drawn from all over Bangladesh and become part of a powerful network of youth leaders.

Building Bridges through Leadership Training 
Building Bridges through Leadership Training (BBLT) is BYLC's 10-week long signature leadership training program. Designed for HSC/Alim/A Levels and first and second year university students, the BBLT program uses a competitive selection process to enroll 42 students from the three different educational tracks, namely English medium, Bengali medium, and Madrassa, in equal numbers.  The curriculum for the program draws heavily from leadership courses taught at Harvard University. The intensive training program, coupled with an experiential learning model, challenges students to critically think about leadership and apply their skills to effectuate positive change in society. In the first phase of the program, students conduct experiments, take risks, and question deeply held assumptions in the classroom. In the second phase, students have the opportunity to translate their learning into action by implementing community service projects in underprivileged communities.

Building Bridges through Leadership Training Junior 
Building Bridges through Leadership Training (BBLT) is BYLC's 4-week long signature leadership training program. The intensive training program, coupled with an experiential learning model, challenges students to critically think about leadership and apply their skills to effectuate positive change in society. In the first phase of the program, students conduct experiments, take risks, and question deeply held assumptions in the classroom. In the second phase, students have the opportunity to translate their learning into action by implementing community service projects in underprivileged communities.

Youth Leadership Bootcamp 
The Youth Leadership Bootcamp (YLB) is a 4-day residential workshop for undergraduate students. The workshop is designed to deliver a transformative personal experience for the participants, build their leadership capabilities, and help them generate innovative thinking. Through a highly competitive application and interview-based screening process, BYLC selects 100 bright and passionate students who are committed to making a positive difference in the lives of others. Bootcamp participants not only develop tangible skills to make them more competitive in their careers, but also gain valuable insights into the workplace through exposure visits.

Youth Leadership Summit 
The 3-day Youth Leadership Summit focuses on the core challenges encountered by youth leaders. Through a competitive screening process, YLS brings a diverse group of young delegates from around the world together with distinguished experts, innovators, and leaders in the public, private, and non-profit sectors for a journey of collective exploration, reflection, and networking. The summit features a mix of plenaries and panels on entrepreneurship, global citizenship, education and career, gender and leadership, politics, and innovation. Teambuilding activities and reflection sessions give delegates opportunities to deepen their understanding of effective, meaningful, and inclusive leadership. Eligible applicants are in college, university, or at the start of their career.

Youth Leadership Prize 
Youth Leadership Prize aims to demonstrate the power of youth in leading change in their communities. BYLC believes that people from all walks of life can exercise leadership regardless of their age or background. The Youth Leadership Prize is a part of our efforts to nurture and encourage the passion of youth by connecting them to the right tools and networks, and help them grow as catalysts of change. BYLC will honor the memory of the late Kathryn Davis by offering 10 BYLC Youth Leadership Prizes to BYLC graduates to enable them to translate their ideas into action. Each prize recipient will get a grant of Taka 750,000 to implement their project.

Office of Professional Development 
The Office of Professional Development (OPD), a key unit of the Bangladesh Youth Leadership Center (BYLC), aims to provide students, fresh graduates, and young professionals with professional development training and placement services.

BYLC Ventures 
BYLC Ventures funds Bangladesh's most promising founders, hone their leadership capabilities, strengthen their business acumen, and help validate their big ideas as they transition into investable business.

Awards and recognition 
In 2009, Ahmad was profiled as one of Asia's most promising young leaders and awarded the 2009–2010 Paragon Fellowship by the Foundation of Youth Social Enterprise. He was also among 20 outstanding young social entrepreneurs recognized by the International Youth Foundation (IYF) for the 2010 YouthActionNet Fellowship. The 2010 fellows came from 18 different countries across five continents. He was also featured in The Washington Post on a special program titled 'On Leadership: Ejaj Ahmad, bringing Obama to Bangladesh'. Assistant secretary Robert O. Blake, Jr. of the Bureau of South and Central Asia Affairs in the US government mentioned the Bangladesh Youth Leadership Center as one of "South Asia's Unheralded Stories" at the 2010 San Diego World Affairs Council. Ahmad was selected as one of the 150 delegates from Asia and the US in the 2010 Asia 21 Young Leaders Summit in Jakarta, Indonesia. In recognition of his work at BYLC, Ejaj Ahmad has received an Ashoka Fellowship in 2016. Additionally, BYLC has received considerable media attention in Bangladesh via newspapers, radio and press conferences.

References 

Youth organisations based in Bangladesh
Leadership training